Gregory Francis Rogers (born 14 August 1948) is an Australian former sprint freestyle swimmer of the 1960s and 1970s, who won a silver and bronze medal in the 4×200-metre and 4×100-metre freestyle relays, respectively, at the 1968 Summer Olympics in Mexico City.  His brother Neil also competed as an Olympic swimmer.

Hailing from Sydney, Rogers was eliminated in the semifinals of the 100-metre freestyle, and the heats of the 400-metre freestyle event.  He then combined with Michael Wenden, Bob Windle and Robert Cusack to win bronze in the 4×100-metre freestyle relay behind the teams from the United States and the Soviet Union.  In the 4×200-metre freestyle relay, he combined with Wenden, Windle and Graham White to claim silver, half a bodylength behind the Americans.

At the 1970 Commonwealth Games in Edinburgh, Scotland, Rogers combined with his brother Neil to claim gold in both the 4×100-metre and 4×200-metre freestyle relays.  Individually he claimed silver and bronze in the 100- and 200-metre freestyle events respectively. Continuing to the 1972 Summer Olympics in Munich, Germany, Rogers had an anticlimactic end to his career, being eliminated in the semifinals of the 100-metre freestyle.

He and his brother Neil both appeared nude in the 1974 August issue in the centre fold pages of Playgirl magazine.

Rogers' son Ryan played for Balmain Tigers lower grades and St George Illawarra Dragons.

See also
 List of Commonwealth Games medallists in swimming (men)
 List of Olympic medalists in swimming (men)
 World record progression 4 × 200 metres freestyle relay

References
 
 

1948 births
Living people
Australian male freestyle swimmers
Olympic swimmers of Australia
Swimmers at the 1968 Summer Olympics
Swimmers at the 1972 Summer Olympics
Olympic silver medalists for Australia
Olympic bronze medalists for Australia
Swimmers from Sydney
World record setters in swimming
Olympic bronze medalists in swimming
Swimmers at the 1970 British Commonwealth Games
Medalists at the 1968 Summer Olympics
Olympic silver medalists in swimming
Commonwealth Games medallists in swimming
Commonwealth Games gold medallists for Australia
Commonwealth Games silver medallists for Australia
Commonwealth Games bronze medallists for Australia
Medallists at the 1970 British Commonwealth Games